Xenisthmus balius is a species of fish in the Xenisthmidae (wriggler) family, which is regarded as a synonymous with the Eleotridae,. It is found in the Persian Gulf.

References

balius
Fish described in 1994
Fish of the Persian Gulf